Chandrika is an Indian daily newspaper in Malayalam language published from Kozhikode, Kerala. The newspaper currently serves as the mouthpiece of Indian Union Muslim League party in Kerala. 

The Chandrika started publishing from Tellicherry (1932) as a monthly platform for north Kerala Muslim community uplift and with a 'reformist' orientation. Its establishment was led by leading local Muslims such as A. K. Kunjumayin Haji, Sattar Sait and K. M. Seethi Sahib. K. K. Muhammad Shafi and C. P. Mammu Keyi were first editor and managing editor of the publication respectively. It became a daily newspaper in 1939. The daily played a significant role in the development of the Muslim community of north Kerala. It moved its headquarters to Calicut in 1946. 

C. H. Muhammed Koya, the future Education Minister of Kerala, served as a sub-editor and the editor of Chandrika in the 1940s. Former Union Minister E. Ahamed was once the reporter of the daily and later served in the Board of Directors. The daily currently represents 'traditionalist' orientation among the Kerala Muslims. 

The daily currently has printing centres in Kozhikode, Kannur, Malappuram, Kochi, Thiruvananthapuram, and Kottayam, and in United Arab Emirates (Dubai), Saudi Arabia (Riyadh, Jeddah, and Dammam), Bahrain, and Qatar (Doha).

See also 
List of Malayalam-language newspapers
List of Malayalam-language periodicals
List of newspapers in India

References 

Daily newspapers published in India
Malayalam-language newspapers
Mass media in Kerala
Indian Union Muslim League
Culture of Kannur
Thalassery
Companies based in Kozhikode
1932 establishments in India
Newspapers published in Kerala
Publications established in 1932
Indian news websites